Bartholomew Donegan (21 December 1910 – 26 August 1978) was a Fianna Fáil politician from County Cork in Ireland. He was a Teachta Dála (TD) from 1957 to 1961, and a Senator from 1963 to 1965.

A farmer and horse breeder, Donegan stood unsuccessfully as a Fianna Fáil candidate for Dáil Éireann in the Cork North constituency at the 1954 general election, before winning the seat at the 1957 general election. After boundary changes, he was defeated in the new Cork North-East constituency at the 1961 general election, and although he stood again in 1969 in Cork Mid, he never returned to the Dáil.

After the loss of his Dáil seat in 1961, Donegan was elected to the 10th Seanad in a by-election on the Agricultural Panel on 28 November 1963, but was defeated at the 1965 election to the 11th Seanad.

References

1910 births
1978 deaths
Fianna Fáil TDs
Members of the 10th Seanad
Members of the 16th Dáil
Politicians from County Cork
Fianna Fáil senators